Yu Zhenwei (born 18 March 1986) is a retired Chinese athlete who competed in the long jump and triple jump. He represented his country at the 2010 IAAF World Indoor Championships and was a bronze medallist at the 2009 Asian Athletics Championships for the host nation.

Yu is a two-time world military champion, having won at the 2009 World Military Track and Field Championships and the 2011 Military World Games.

International competitions

References

Living people
1986 births
Chinese male long jumpers
21st-century Chinese people